Tiswadi (or simply Ilhas) is a  sub-district in the district of North Goa, situated in the Indian coastal state of Goa. It is the largest and populous island of Goa situated in the basin of the Zuari and Mandovi rivers. It was one of the first territories to be annexed by Portugal in 1510 AD. Both the state capital Panaji, and the former capital Old Goa are within the sub-district. It is one of 6 major islands between the Mandovi and Zuari rivers.

Etymology
The word Tiswadi itself, originated in the late 1970s and it referred to thirty settlements of Goud Saraswat Brahmins who settled when they migrated to Goa. The descendants of these settlers now form the native Bammon (Brahman) community.

Geography
It is geographically made up of several small riverine islands within the Mandovi River forming its northern boundary, the Cumbarjua Canal making its eastern border, and the Zuari River making up its southern border.

As the native name suggests, the  sub-district includes the smaller islands of:
 Chorão,
 Divar,
 St Estevam,
 Cumbarjua,
 Vanxim and
 Several other small mangrove islands and sand banks.

History
Tiswadi, along with the rest of Goa, regularly exchanged hands between the Muslim Bhahmani Sultanate and the Hindu Vijayanagara Empire of South India prior to the 14th century. By the 15th century, the Bijapur Sultanate under the Adil Shahi dynasty conquered Goa, and it came under Muslim rule. The City of Goa was the regional capital of the sultanates as well as a hub for the Hajj pilgrimage. Numerous temples were demolished under the rule of the sultanates. The Adil Shahi dynasty was defeated by a Portuguese–Vijayanagar alliance, and Ilhas de Goa was conquered under Afonso de Albuquerque in 1510. By the time Tiswadi was relieved from Muslim rule, Hindus formed a minority in the region, and the Portuguese started conversion efforts against the Muslim majority. The populace was made to accept Christianity or leave the islands. There was a mass exodus of natives who left the islands, for the safer havens of Ponda and the Canara, Malabar Coast, Chandgad and Joida.

The first temple to be built in Panjim was in the mid-1700s, when the Portuguese authorities granted permission to the Hindus to build their place of worship.

The evangelization of Tiswadi was spearheaded by the Dominicans, who were assigned 15 villages, and the Jesuits, who were assigned the remaining part along with the smaller islands of Chorão and Divar, by the Portuguese authorities. In 1552, the island of Chorão had a population of 300 Christians out of 3,000 and, by this time, also had a small church which was visited by a Jesuit from St. Paul's every Sunday. By the end of 1559, over 1,200 had accepted baptism. The following year, the first bishop from the Jesuit order, Dom João Nunes de Barreto, set up residence in Chorão, which eventually became a Noviciate. Most of Chorão's population converted en masse to Roman Catholicism in mid-1560.

By January 1563, the Jesuit provincial claimed that Ilhas de Goa had been completely Christianized, with a population of 70,000, the great majority of which had converted in the last six years, corresponding to the terms of Viceroys Francisco Barreto and Constantino of Braganza, whose -year term saw between 25,000 and 30,000 conversions.

Highlights
Panjim, Velha Goa and its monuments, Divar, Chorão

Settlements

Cities

Towns

Villages

Maps
The evidence of the existence of Ilhas de Goa can be seen on historic maps.

Water Bodies
The island lies within the water bodies of:
 Mandovi River to the north.
 Cumbarjua Canal to the east.
 Zuari River to the south.
 Arabian Sea to the west.

Ferries
Prior to the construction of the bridges, the primary commute to and from the island was done via ferry. Some have become redundant, but most are still in use, they include:
 Panjim to Betim.
 Ribandar to Chorao.
 Ribandar to Divar.
 Old Goa to Divar.
 Daugim to Tolto in St Estevam.
 Gandaulim to Cumbarjua.
 Agaçaim to Cortalim.

Bridges
There are a number of bridges built over the last hundred years, linking the island to other parts of the mainland.

Northern Bridges
These bridges are built over the Mandovi River. They pass through the villages of Penha de França and the city of Panjim:
 2 Mandovi Bridges: Connects Goa to Bardes.
 Atal Bridge: Connects Goa to  Bardes, but avoids the busy roads of Panjim entirely.

Eastern Bridges
These bridges are built over the Cumbarjua Canal.
 Gandaulim Bridge: Connects Gandaulim in Goa to Cumbarjua.
 Banastarim Bridge: Connects Corlim in Goa to Banastarim.

Southern Bridges
These bridges are built over the Zuari River. They pass through the villages of Agaçaim and Cortalim.
 Zuari Bridge: Connects Goa to Mormugão.
 A new Bridge is being constructed (similar in scale to the Atal Bridge) over the Zuari River.

Internal Bridges
These bridges are a link to places within the island, which are geographically close, but are separated by a body of water.
 Ponte Conde de Linhares: This links Panjim to Ribandar, and is the oldest and most famous of all the internal bridges.

See also
Konkani people
History of Goa
Salcette
Bardez
Goan Catholics

References

Islands of the Indian Ocean
Islands of Goa
Taluks of Goa
Geography of North Goa district
Tourist attractions in North Goa district